The Battle of Go Cong was a small battle during the Vietnam War. It took place on September 3, 1963 near Gò Công, Tiền Giang Province, after the General Staff of the Viet Cong (VC) called for "another Ap Bac" on South Vietnamese forces. The intent of the operation was to drive out the VC who had survived the earlier Ap Bac engagement. The battle was won by American and South Vietnamese forces, after inflicting heavy casualties on the VC, using artillery to slaughter VC fighters fleeing American special operation troops who ambushed them with intense sniper fire. It was later discovered that the 91 of the captured VC troops were new recruits, and did not have weapons.

References
 Quoc Vinh, Tran (1965) Quan doi nhan dan: Resolutely defeat the American aggressors. Hanoi, Vietnam.

Battles and operations of the Vietnam War
Battles involving the United States
Battles and operations of the Vietnam War in 1963
September 1963 events in Asia
History of Tiền Giang Province